Federal Route 140 (formerly Melaka state route M4) is a federal road in Melaka, Malaysia. It connects Pantai Kundor in the west to Cheng in the east. The Kilometre Zero of the Federal Route 140 starts at Pantai Kundor.

Features

At most sections, the Federal Route 140 was built under the JKR R5 road standard, with a speed limit of 90 km/h.

List of junctions

References

139